CSI Aviation, Inc. is a worldwide aviation services company and FAR Part 135 air carrier (Certificate# GRTA447E) headquartered in Albuquerque, New Mexico with bases in Killeen, Texas, and West Palm Beach, Florida. Founded in 1979 by Allen Weh, CSI provides air charter and aircraft leasing to corporations, athletic teams, political campaigns  and government agencies.  CSI also maintains a GSA Schedule (Contract # GS-33F-0025V) to provide air charter services to the Federal government as both an operator and as a broker.

History
CSI Aviation was founded by Allen Weh, a now retired colonel in the United States Marine Corps Reserve, in 1979.

In 1983, CSI began representing various United States airlines to the U.S. Department of Defense (DOD) through the U.S. Transportation Command, which included handling Civil Reserve Air Fleet (CRAF) issues and coordinating domestic and international military air charter requirements.

In 2009, CSI began offering fuel services.

In 2014, CSI acquired a Texas based Part 135 Operation to add organic executive charter capability to its operations.

In 2016, CSI's Part 135 division added Medical Flight Services.

CSI Aviation's Medical Flight Services group is accredited by the National Accreditation Alliance Medical Transport Applications (NAAMTA)

2017–present 
In September 2017,  CSI deployed the Seeker Aircraft to Southeast Texas in support of the Hurricane Harvey relief efforts.

CSI was awarded the Freedom Award by the Department of Defense in 2017 for its support of military employees.

CSI Aviation was certified by the U.S. Military Commercial Airlift Review Board (CARB) in 2018 to operate on-demand passenger, cargo and air medical flights for the U.S. Defense Department (DOD) 

In 2019,  CSI was awarded a position on a $5.7 billion contract to provide worldwide airlift services for the US Department of Defense (DoD).  The firm-fixed-price indefinite-delivery, indefinite-quantity contract was awarded by the US Transportation Command (TRANSCOM).

Also in 2019, CSI began operating daily flights under contract for the U.S. Navy between West Palm Beach, FL and a Navy Base in Bahama Islands.

Fleet

CSI operates a fleet of twin engine high performance Beechcraft turboprops. These aircraft are preferred for their excellent safety record, comfort, speed, and reliability. All aircraft operated by CSI are flown by two type rated pilots.

The CSI Aviation fleet includes the following aircraft (as of October, 2020):

References

External links
 

Airlines based in New Mexico
Transport companies established in 1979
Companies based in Albuquerque, New Mexico
1979 establishments in New Mexico